Vítějeves is a municipality and village in Svitavy District in the Pardubice Region of the Czech Republic. It has about 400 inhabitants.

Notable people
Zdeněk Otava (1902–1980), operatic singer

References

Villages in Svitavy District